The 2022 Auckland Rugby League season is its 114th season since the founding of the Auckland Rugby League in 1909. Point Chevalier Pirates won the Fox Memorial Shield for the 6th time with a 14–12 win over the Glenora Bears. 

Manurewa Kowhai, the Manurewa Marlins premier women's team, won the women's premiership when they defeated Point Chevalier 16 points to 6. Their championship team, the Manurewa Whero, won the championship competition.

The Akarana Falcons men's and women's teams both won the New Zealand Rugby League Premiership competitions. The men's team beat Canterbury Bulls 46–4 in the final on October 1 at North Harbour Stadium, while the women beat Counties Manukau Stingrays 24–12 at Mount Smart Stadium on April 16.

        
        
        
        

 The season began with a northern regional age group representative competition for under 16's (Shaun Johnson Shield) and under 18's (Dean Bell Cup). The finals were held on April 2 at Mount Smart Stadium in Auckland. Tāmaki ki te Tonga (South) defeated Tāmaki ki te Raki (North) 20 points to 12 to win the U16 Shaun Johnson Shield. The Under 18 Dean Bell Cup was won by Tāmaki ki te Uru (West), who beat Tāmaki ki te Raki (North) 46–12. The Ruben Wiki Cup for the New Zealand Under 20s teams was won by Akarana Falcons, representing the North Shore and West Auckland clubs. They beat the South Island Scorpions 34–16 in the final at Mt Smart Stadium on April 16. Following this match the New Zealand Women's premiership final was played between Akarana Falcons and Counties-Manukau Stingrays, with Akarana winning their first title in 11 years when they won 24–12.

 The Fox Memorial Shield competition was split into 2 sections with 9 teams in section 1 and 10 teams in section 2. This was the first time in many years that all teams were technically eligible to win the premier senior men's title. It did however mean that there were a large number of very lopsided matches. Section 1 however was relatively competitive. In section 2 Glenora Bears and Otahuhu Leopards finished in the top 2 positions and secured home semi finals which they both won to advance to the semi finals where they met each other with Glenora winning 28–16. In section 1 Point Chevalier Pirates and Howick Hornets met in their semi final with Point Chevalier winning 24–12. In the grand final on August 6, Point Chevalier defeated Glenora before a crowd of 1,000 at Mt Smart Stadium 1 by 14 points to 12. This was the 6th time Point Chevalier had won the Fox Memorial Shield in their history with the previous wins being in 1953, 2013, 2014, 2015, and 2018. The match doubled as the Stormont Shield final so Point Chevalier had an additional trophy to add to the cabinet. The held on to the Roope Rooster Trophy also after going undefeated in home challenges. Northcote Tigers won the Sharman Cup when they defeated Pakuranga Jaguars 32–28 in the curtain-raiser to the Fox Memorial final at Mt Smart on August 6. this was their 4th time winning the Sharman Cup after previous wins in 1979, 2003, and 2007. Point Chevalier also won the reserve grade title after beating Te Atatu Roosters 18–6 in the Fox Premier firsts final on August 5, while Bay Roskill Vikings defeated Otara Scorpions 22–14 in the Fox Championship Premier firsts final.

The Senior B, Ray Cranch Cup was won by Pukekohe Pythons who beat Takahiwai Northern (Northern Pine) 25–24 in the grand final. Richmond Tokes beat East Coast Bays in the consolation final 36–14.

In the lower grades Otara won the Under 18 boys, Marist won the Under 16 Boys and Mangere East the Under 16 Girls grades. The Under 15 Boys competition was won by Papatoetoe, while the Under 14 Boys was won by Mt Albert, and the Under 14 Girls was won by Mangere East. Ellerslie won the Under 13 Boys competition.

Season news

Fox Memorial
The Fox Memorial competition for senior teams for 2022 has been shortened due to covid. It will be played over 13 weekends following a later start date than usual (May 7). There will be 2 sections with 9 teams in section 1 and 10 teams in section 2 with the sections organised based on finishing positions in the senior competitions from the 2021 season. The top 6 teams will progress to the Fox Memorial Premiership after 9 rounds and play in a series of knockout games. The top qualifying team from each section will then compete for the Fox Memorial Shield. Teams who finish in the 7–9 and 7–10 positions will playoff for the Sharman Cup. Waitemata Seagulls were originally in section 1 but withdrew a week prior to the commencement of the competition. Ponsonby Ponies was fielding a premier grade side for the first time in 3 seasons though it was in conjunction with the Glenfield Greyhounds. Their first grade side was the Ponsonby club, while the reserve grade side was from the Glenfield club.
 
The 2 sections were as follows:
Section 1: Howick Hornets, Mount Albert Lions, Point Chevalier Pirates, Bay Roskill Vikings, Northcote Tigers, Otara Scorpions, Manukau Magpies, Manurewa Marlins, and Hibiscus Coast Raiders.
Section 2: Glenora Bears, Otahuhu Leopards, Marist Saints, Richmond Rovers, Te Atatu Roosters, Mangere East Hawks, Pakuranga Jaguars, Papakura Sea Eagles, Papatoetoe Panthers, Ponsonby Ponies-(G)

After 9 rounds the 2 teams which gained first round byes from section 1 were Point Chevalier and Howick, while in section 2 Glenora and Otahuhu did the same. In the preliminary finals of the playoffs Mt Albert, Bay Roskill, Te Atatu, and Richmond secured wins to advance to what were effectively quarter final matches. In the quarter final matches Pt Chevalier defeated Mt Albert, Howick defeated Bay Roskill, Glenora defeated Te Atatu, and Otahuhu defeated Richmond, meaning all four home sides won with no upsets. The semi finals were played at Mt Smart #2 on July 30 with the Glenora defeating Otahuhu 26-18 and the Pt Chevalier beating Howick 24 t0 12. 

Pt Chevalier won a tightly contested grand final on August 6 at Mt Smart Stadium #1 by 14 points to 12 to win their 6th ever Fox Memorial title.

Coaching
The Mount Albert Lions were coached by former New Zealand international Daniel (David) Fa'alogo, and Matt Sturm. Both were ex-Mount Albert players. Sturm also represented New Zealand Māori. Hibiscus Coast Raiders were coached by former Warrior, Jeremiah Pai, who also represented New Zealand Māori. Northcote were coached by former player David Bhana. Richmond's coach was Ricky Henry. Te Atatu were coached by Phil Gordon for the 4th season, and his 2nd as sole head coach. Brian Lafaele was the Otahuhu coach, while Glenora was led by Tony Benson who had been coaching professionally in England for the past two decades as well as coaching the Kiwi Ferns in 2017–18. The Marist side was coached by Zane Pocklington. The very experienced Bernie Herenara coached the Mangere East Hawks side who were in a rebuilding phase after losing many players to other clubs in the off season. Martin Riding was the coach of the Ponsonby (G) side who were making their first appearance in the top grade for a few seasons. The Howick coach was Ruka Loza, who was head coach of Howick for the first time. Manukau's coach was Tamore Nati. Thaine Ashford was the coach of Manurewa. The coach of Pt Chevalier was Frank Fuimaono. Johnathon Paul was coaching the Bay Roskill Vikings, while Visesio Setefano was the head coach of the Papakura Sea Eagles. Pakuranga's head coach was Pila Hingano.

Promotion/relegation
After the 9 rounds of the regular season the top 12 sides were Pt Chevalier, Glenora, Otahuhu, Te Atatu, Howick, Richmond, Marist, Mt Albert, Bay Roskill, Manukau, Otara & Mangere East. While those teams who finished in the bottom 3 in section 1 and 4 in section 2 were Northcote, Pakuranga, Ponsonby, Manurewa, Hbiscus Coast, Papakura, and Papatoetoe. The top 12 were guaranteed a place in the 2023 Fox Memorial premiership with the remaining teams left to compete in the second division Sharman Cup.

Women's competitions
As in previous seasons the women's competition matches are being played on Sunday's at 2:30pm. The competing teams in the women's premier grade are: Howick Hornets, Manurewa Wahine Kowhai, Otahuhu Leopards Women, Otara Scorpion Stingers, Point Chevalier Pirates, Ponsonby Ponies, Richmond Roses, and Taniwharau.

The teams in the championship grade are: Manurewa Wahine Whero, Pukekohe Pythons, Marist Saints, Manukau Magpies, and Glenora Bears.

Coaching
In the Premier Women's competition the sides are coached by Anthony Murray (Richmond Roses), Dion Briggs (Ponsonby), Louis Papalii (Otara), James Sarah (Howick), Sefuluai Tamotu (Otahuhu), and Bronson Harden (Pt Chevalier).

In the championship competition the sides were coached by Alamoti Finau (Marist), Losi Uele (Glenora Valkyries), Joshua Siaosi (Manukau), Chris Whiumui (Pukekohe), and Anthony Matua (Manurewa Wahine Whero).

Premier 1st's competition
The reserve grade competition followed the same format as the Fox Memorial Shield premiership. Each side played as the curtain-raiser to their more senior side. The combined Ponsonby-Glenfield side was known as 'Glenfield P' but was entirely made up from players of the Glenfield club. The Manukau and Pt Chevalier sides emerged from section 1 to make up one semi final, while Te Atatu came up against Otahuhu in the section 2 semi final. In the Premier First Championship for the lower placed teams Otara and Bay Roskill emerged as the winners for each section to meet in the final.

Ray Cranch senior B competition
The Ray Cranch Cup, named after the New Zealand international was competed for by Avondale Wolves (affiliated to the Marist club), Pt Chevalier Green, Otara Scorpions Wymondley Strong, Pukekohe Pythons, Richmond Tokes, Otara Scorpions No Excuses, Ponsonby Ponies Central Stallions, Manurewa Marlins, Waitemata Seagulls, East Coast Bays Barricudas, and Otahuhu Snr A Leopards.

Inter-club trophies
In addition to the main competition for the Fox Memorial Shield there were also several trophies played for between individual senior sides. Point Chevalier beat Bay Roskill in round 1 to claim their inter-club trophy (Ernie Roiall Memorial Trophy). While Northcote defeated Hibiscus Coast in round 1 to win their inter-club trophy (Ted Dalton Cup). In round 5 on June 11 Pt Chevalier beat Mt Albert 42–16 to retain the Lani Latoa Memorial Cup. Glenora defeated Te Atatu 32–6 at Jack Colvin Park during the regular season to retain the Denis Williams Cup on June 18.

Club teams and grade participation
Marist and Mt Albert fielded a combined side in the U16 grade hence their 1.5 and 21.5 totals. Manurewa Marlins and Otara Scorpions fielded the most teams across all grades with 29. Waikato fielded one team in the Masters grade. Takahiwai were a Northland club but fielded their senior side in the Auckland Senior B competition. Avondale Wolves fielded a Senior B side but were affiliated with the Marist Saints club.

SAS Fox Memorial Premiership

Section 1 Standings

Section 2 Standings

Fox Memorial results

Round 1
Northcote won the Ted Dalton Cup with their 28–22 win over Hibiscus Coast at Stanmore Bay. Pt Chevalier won the Ernie Roiall Memorial Trophy with a 36–22 win at Walker Park over Bay Roskill. The Howick match with Mt Albert at Paparoa Park in Howick was the live streamed match of the round and saw the home team, Howick, win 32–26 with a converted try in the last few minutes to Uila Aiolupo after the scores had been tied 26–26. Te Atatu were captained once more by Api Pēwhairangi who opened the season with a 52–0 win over Mangere East. James Gavet had returned to his junior club Richmond Rovers following time at the Huddersfield Giants. Ponsonby United made their return to the first grade competition for the first time in several seasons. They were well beaten at Murray Halberg Park by Marist by 82 points to 26.

Section 1

Section 2

Round 2
 Round 2 saw 6 of the 9 games won by the away team. Glenora's 88–0 win over Papakura saw Wyatt Rangi run in 5 tries and Kadiyae Ioka kick 10 tries to go with a try for 24 points. Former Newcastle Knights and Gold Coast Titans player Paterika Vaivai scored his first try for Te Atatu in a 66–0 win over Ponsonby who were playing their first home game in the top grade for a few years. Eiden Ackland returned to the Mt Albert side after time spent with the Manly Sea Eagles. He scored a try and kicked 5 conversions in a 30–22 win at the Birkenhead War Memorial against Northcote. Kalani Ili was playing for Mangere East. He had spent 2 seasons with the South Sydney Rabbitohs NYC side and was their captain in 2017.
Section 1

Section 2

Round 3
 Round 3 saw some enormous scores run up in section 2. Glenora defeated Papatoetoe by the astonishing scoreline of 120 to 0 at Kohuora Park in Papatoetoe. Richmond also trounced Ponsonby 80–6 in Grey Lynn, and Marist made short work of Papakura at Prince Edward Park 84–0. In the live streamed match Te Atatu defeated Otahuhu for the first time in many years 42–22. For Te Atatu, their hooker off the bench, Khalan Clyde, formerly a Northern Sword U18 representative who had attended Westlake Boys High School in 2021 scored his second try of the year. Te Atatu's starting hooker Tuteauru Maipi scored a double which gave him 6 for the season to this point. Otahuhu hooker Phoenix Hunt scored a try in the second half. He was a former Otahuhu College player who had spent time with the South Sydney Rabbitohs NYC team before coming back to Auckland and helping Papakura win the Fox title in 2016 before then returning to his junior Otahuhu club with his brother Jamel Hunt.
Section 1

Section 2

Round 4
A serious injury to a Glenora player in their match with Pakuranga at Harold Moody Park in Glen Eden saw the match finish just 8 minutes into the second half with the score 34–4 in favour of Glenora. The live streamed match was the clash between Manukau and Bay Roskill at Moyle Park which finished in a thrilling 40–40 draw with Joshua Tanielu kicking a conversion from wide out with time up to lock up the scores. Point Chevalier had an easy 72–8 win over Hibiscus Coast at Walker Park with veteran player Francis Leger scoring 2 tries and kicking 7 conversions. The match between Manurewa and Northcote at Mountford Park was also streamed on Pete's Films and saw the home side Manurewa hang on for a 26–22 win which was their first of the season. The match between Otara and Howick saw the visiting Howick side win 32–20 with 13 unconverted tries scored in the match.

Section 1

Section 2

Round 5
Philip Kingi played his 150th game for Glenora in their match with Marist and he kicked a conversion in their 22–12 win. Papatoetoe suffered another heavy defeat, losing to Te Atatu by the unusual score of 94 to 1. Papatoetoe's standoff Jordyn Makiha slotted a drop goal midway through the second half to make the score 70–1. He attempted another on full time but it was partially charged down and the match finished shortly after. For Te Atatu, Kahil Johnson scored 4 tries and kicked 2 goals, while Api Pēwhairangi scored 1 try and kicked 10 conversions from 12 attempts. Hikoirangi Paki scored 3 tries on debut. Nicholas Malalilo scored a hat trick in Richmond's 56–0 win over Papakura with Hawaiiki Annandale converting 6 of their 11 tries. Pakuranga secured their second win of the season when late tries to Boss Rolleston took them from 22 to 20 down to a 28–22 win. Earlier Manu Tukia had grabbed a hat trick while Timor Reese Williams had done the same for Ponsonby. The live stream match saw Pt Chevalier maintain their unbeaten record with a comfortable 42–16 win over Mt Albert at Fowld's Park with Lewis Soosemea and Saula Solomona both scoring 2 tries each. The win meant that Pt Chevalier retained the Lani Latoa Memorial Cup. Latoa had played for both clubs but tragically died in 1995 during a game at Carlaw Park between North Harbour Sea Eagles and the Auckland Warriors reserves. He fell on the ball and broke his windpipe. Sione Feao and Fiohiva Siale Faingaa also scored doubles in Otahuhu's 38–16 win over Mangere East at Walter Massey Park.
Section 1

Section 2

Round 6

The most anticipated match of round 6 was the match between Te Atatu and Glenora at Jack Colvin Park in Te Atatu for the Denis Williams Cup. New Zealand international Dennis Williams played the majority of his career with Te Atatu but did enjoy a successful season with Glenora as well. Unfortunately it was not as tightly fought as expected and Glenora got on top early and controlled the match to win 32–6. Dennis Williams presented the trophy named in his honour to the Glenora captain Kouma Samson. Pt Chevalier beat Northcote easily at Walker Park 52 to 16 with Matthew Whyte scoring a hat trick and Brody Tamarua scoring twice to go along with 4 conversions. The live streamed match was Marist against Pakuranga which saw Marist win 50–12 with Sagele Palaamo scoring 3 tries and Doux Kauhiva kicking 6 conversions for the winners. Otahuhu beat Ponsonby 68–8 with William Stowers scoring 2 tries and kicking 7 goals for a personal tally of 22 points. Papakura scored their first points in 5 games with a converted try in a 42–6 loss to Mangere East. Brody Tamarua scored twice and kicked 4 conversions in Pt Chevalier's 52–16 win over Northcote. For Mt Albert in their 34–30 win over Bay Roskill, Eiden Ackland scored 2 tries and kicked 5 goals.

Section 1

Section 2

Round 7

The round started early with Ponsonby and Papakura playing on Matariki Day at Sunnynook Park. Ponsonby won easily by 52 points to 8. Levi Helleur-Atiga secured a hat trick while Taani Fangupo converted 8 of their 9 tries. Pt Chevalier had a big 58–10 win over Manurewa with Mathew Whyte scoring 4 tries. Eiden Ackland scored 3 tries and kicked 8 conversions in Mt Albert's 56–14 win over Otara. In the live streamed match Glenora had a comfortable 36–4 win over Richmond at Harold Moody Park. Chase Bernard scored a double, as did Mose Esera who also converted 4 of their 7 tries. Bay Roskill won a tight contest over Northcote 26–22. The scores were locked at 22-all before Ben Henry kicked 2 late penalties to secure a vital win for the Vikings. Pakuranga put up a plucky effort against Otahuhu with Molisoni Faiva scoring a hat trick in a 36–22 defeat. Marist handed Te Atatu their second consecutive defeat with a 36–28 win at Murray Halberg Park. Te Atatu led by 10 in the second half before 18 unanswered points to Marist including a 60-metre try to Doux Kauhiva sealed the match. Kauhiva also kicked 5 conversions and a penalty. Te Atatu were missing regular halves Api Pēwhairangi, who was out of Auckland, and Reece Joyve who was in Australia playing for the Cook Islands against Samoa.

Section 1

Section 2

Round 8
Hibiscus Coast hosted the Howick Hornets at Stanmore Bay in their 40th anniversary celebration day. The match was also the live streamed match of the round with Lewin Hudson and Wade Brunsdon in commentary. The Raiders put up a spirited showing against the second placed Hornets with Ian Mills scoring first, before eventually going down 22–12. Northcote notched their second win of the season when they beat Otara 36–28 to keep their slim playoff hopes alive. Martin Watson converted 5 of their 6 tries and kicked a penalty. Manukau secured a rare win over Mt Albert at Fowld's Park 18–12. A 63rd-minute penalty to Samuel Nati put them in front by 2, before Koronato John scored in the 73rd minute to give them a 6-point lead which they hung on to. Richmond and Marist met at Grey Lynn Park for the Eddie Poching Memorial Cup with Richmond running out comfortable 26–8 winners. Bay Roskill sealed a playoff spot with a 40–14 win over Manurewa. Josh Tanielu converted 6 of their 7 tries. Otahuhu racked up 104 points in their win over the struggling Papakura side while Te Atatu also made short work of Pakuranga and won 78–8 while blooding several new first grade players.
Section 1

Section 2

Round 9
In the final round of matches before the playoffs there were several matches that had repercussions for the final placings of teams. In Section 1 in the live streamed match Northcote beat Manukau 18 to 4. Kevin Locke joined the Northcote side for the match after returning from France earlier in the week. They finished the season with 6 competition points and a for and against percentage of 76.58% versus Otara who had a percentage of 79.66% meaning they went through in 6th place. Otara's 10 point win over Manurewa proving crucial. Pt Chevalier visited Paparoa Park and thrashed the local side 50–20  though both teams were secure in first and second place already. Mt Albert and Bay Roskill leapfrogged Manukau into 3rd and 4th respectively courtesy of a 60–8 win over Hibiscus Coast and two points for the bye in the case of Bay Roskill.

In Section 2 Te Atatu secured 3rd position with a gutsy 26–18 win over Richmond. Playing into a strong westerly wind blowing straight down the field Richmond played strongly and led 12–10 until a late intercept by second rower John Suli who raced 90 metres to score gave the home side a 16–12 lead at the break. Playing into the wind in the second half the Roosters were clinical, controlling possession and field position to earn a home playoff match the following week. Marist took care of Mangere East to finish 5th, tied with Richmond on 12 competitions points, just one percentage point behind Richmond (243.28% vs 242.17%). The margin was even tighter to find the final playoff team. Pakuranga beat Papakura at Ti Rakau Park 54–18 but will be wishing they had scored just one more point at some stage in the season as Mangere East's 46–12 loss to Marist meant they finished with a for and against percentage of 65.43% which shaded Pakuranga's 65.19%. With Marist's win they held on to the Roy Chan Cup.

Section 1

Section 2

Fox Premiership preliminary finals

The first week of finals saw Pt Chevalier, Howick, Glenora, and Otahuhu have byes by virtue of finishing in the top 2 in their respective sections. The live stream match was played between Mt Albert and Otara. It was commentated by Dale Husband and Richie Barnett. Mt Albert won the match 36–18 after pushing on from an 18–10 lead with Eiden Ackland scoring 3 tries and kicking 6 conversions from 6. Sebastian Su'a who had signed on for the Newcastle Knights for 2023 scored twice. Te Atatu had a relatively easy win over Mangere East who only had 1 reserve for much of the game due to "last-minute pull-outs, illness, and a high amount of injuries" according to their social media feed. Delaney Chaney-Puata scored a second half hat trick with Cook Island international Reece Joyce converting 9 tries in Api Pēwhairangi's absence through illness. Bay Roskill held off Manukau 28–22 in the only tight match of the weekend to advance to play Howick. Marist proved far too strong for Richmond at Grey Lynn Park, winning 34–0 with Kameli Vasu scoring twice in a 6 tries to nil victory. The match was streamed by Petes Filming.

Section 1

Section 2

Fox Premiership quarter finals
All four home teams who came into their matches off a weeks rest won, with most margins being reasonably comfortable. The one exception was the Otahuhu win over Richmond by 20 points to 12. The score was 14–12 at halftime before a late try to Phoenix Hunt sealed the win. In the live streamed game Glenora jumped out to an early 12–0 lead, scoring 2 tries off the back of kicks. Akarana Falcons U20 full back Esom Ioka climbed to take a bomb and sprinted over and then Mosese Faeamani dived on a loose ball in the in goal to score a second. Another try to James Taumata threatened to end the game as a contest but a try to Te Atatu's Royden Gillett and conversion by Api Pēwhairangi made the half time score 16–6. The second half was relatively even but Glenora pushed on for a 26–12 win. Mt Albert made a spirited showing at Walker Park and the score was locked up at 18–18 at half time. Tevita Latu scored the go ahead try early in the second half and then Pt Chevalier came home strongly to win 40–22. Howick made fairly easy work of Bay Roskill, winning 44 points to 6 at Paparoa Park. The match was live streamed by Petes Filming.

Section 1

Section 2

Fox Premiership semifinals
Section 1

Section 2

Fox Memorial Premiership grand final
Soape Kavaliku and Daniel Reuelu-Buchanan were both making their 100th appearance for the Glenora Bears. Point Chevalier Pirates won a closely fought Fox Memorial final 14–12 over the Glenora after taking a 10–6 lead into halftime. They scored a brilliant try after Pt Chevalier junior, Ollie Tuimavave (who brought up 50 games for the Pirates during the year) returned a kick over 50 metres before a centering grubber kick was gathered by Harley Maynard, who crashed over under the posts in the tackle of Kadiyae Ioka. They stretched their lead 3 minutes later with a try to captain Francis Leger who stepped infield and dived across.  Glenora narrowed the gap late in the first half with Chaz Brown beating Leger on the outside to cross, with Mose Esera converting. Point Chevalier pushed their lead back out to 8 early n the second half with a try in the left corner to Matthew Whyte. With 30 minutes remaining Glenora scored a converted try to Fatani Paea Manukia after a superb offload from former NZ Police rugby league representative, Chase Bernard. The conversion made the margin just 2 points. Despite coming close several times neither team could add further points and Pt Chevalier held out for the win. Brody Tamarua of Point Chevalier was awarded the Doug Price Memorial Medal for man of the match. The match was live streamed on YouTube and also broadcast live on Sky Sport with Glen Larmer and Wade Brunsdon commentating.

Fox Championship (Sharman Cup)
The Fox Championship was played between the teams which finished in the bottom 3 of Section 1 and bottom 4 of Section 2.

Fox Championship preliminary finals
Section 1

Section 2

Fox Championship quarter finals
Section 1

Section 2

Fox Championship semi finals
Northcote made easy work of Ponsonby at the Birkenhead War Memorial, romping away to a 48–4 win. James Waterson scored a hat trick for the home side, and Martin Watson converted 6 of their 9 tries. The match was streamed by Petes Filming. Pakuranga had to come back twice after trailing 12–0 after 15 minutes, and 18–12 after 50 minutes. Three unconverted tries to Manu Tukia, Ofa Pulu, and Samuel Fonua edged them home at Ti Rakau Park in Pakuranga.

Section 1

Section 2

Fox Championship (Sharman Cup) grand final
  The Northcote Tigers won the Sharman Cup by defeating the Pakuranga Jaguars in a thrilling match 32–28. They threatened to run away with the game when Huston Holloway scored his second try which was converted in the 61st minute to make the score 32–16. However two late tries to Pakuranga through Ofa Pulu in the 67th minute and Manu Tukia in the 70th minute narrowed the margin to just 4 points with 9 minutes remaining. Northcote held on however for the win. The match was live streamed on YouTube.

Women's Competitions

Farrelly Photos Women's Premiership

Standings

Round 1
Last years semi-finalists met again to open the season with Pt Chevalier winning 26–14 in Grey Lynn. Katelyn Vaha'akolo scored a run away try late in the match to seal the victory for the defending champions. For Richmond Waiana Jones scored twice. Ponsonby opened with a 34–16 win at Paparoa Park controlling the game with 7 tries, each to different players, 3 of which were converted by Mele Hufanga. Otahuhu, who were back with a new side went down to the Waikato side, Taniwharau 44–6. Ilaisaane Taufa scored Otahuhu's only points with a try and conversion. Nadia Flavell bagged 4 tries for Taniwharau, while Calista Ruruku kicked 2 conversions. Manurewa Kowhai and Otara fought out a 20–20 draw at Mountfort Park in Manurewa.

Round 2
Ponsonby recorded their first win (26-16) over Manurewa since they joined the premier women's competition in 2018. They had 5 separate try scorers with Mele Hufanga complimenting her try with 3 conversions, while Danielle Apaina was the player of the day. Mackenzie Wiki scored twice for the losers. Pt Chevalier made short work of Howick at Walker Park winning 52–4 with Lavinia Tauhalaliku scoring 4 tries. Kylie Porter scored the only points for Howick. Richmond Roses beat Taniwharau 34–10 at Opaheke Sports Park with Laishon Jones scoring once and converting 3 of their 7 tries. Otara recorded their first win on the season beating Otahuhu 20–6 at Ngati Otara Park. Wati Deleilomaloma scored twice in their win with Aketule McKinley-Sadaraka converting 2 tries.

Round 3
Richmond held their club day with the Richmond Roses playing curtain raiser to the premier men's match at Grey Lynn Park. Richmond won a thriller with Laishon Jones scoring twice and kicking 3 conversions. Rowena Meleisea also scored twice for Richmond, while Mele Hufanga converted 4 of Ponsonby's 5 tries. Howick had 7 separate try scorers in their 32–26 win over Taniwharau, with Zayde Sarah-Baldwin converting 3 of them. Charlette Butler and Trinity Crosby each scored twice for Taniwharau with Calista Ruruku scoring once and kicking 3 conversions.

Round 4
Otara secured their second win with a 20–8 win away to Taniwharau, with Wati Delailomaloma scoring another double. Shannon Leota scored twice in Richmond's 18–10 win over Howick. Ponsonby thrashed Otahuhu 60–8 at Bert Henham Park with Mele Hufanga scoring 4 tries and her namesake Mele Maatuleio Fotu-Moala scoring 3. Hufanga also kicked 4 conversions for a personal haul of 24 points.

Round 5

Round 6

Round 7

Round 8

Round 9

Round 10
The match between Howick and Richmond was played on Friday night, under lights at Paparoa Park, the home of Howick. Howick won a close fought game 22–14.

Round 11

Round 12

Women's Premiership quarter finals

Women's Premiership semifinal

Women's Premiership grand final
Maunurewa Kowhai won their first title with a 16–6 win over Pt Chevalier. The match had been scoreless until Monica Samita crossed for a Pt Chevalier try in the 48th minute. Manurewa retaliated with a try to Christyl Stowers before two late tries to Kararaina Wira Hohu and Kerehitina Denise gave them the lead and the win. The match was live streamed and broadcast on Sky TV.

Farrelly Photos Women's Championship

Standings

Round 1
Manukau won a close match at Murray Halberg Park 30–28. They lost 3 players during the match to injury but hung on to win. Delainah Marsters scored twice for the winners, and Platinum Marsters kicked a crucial 5 conversions. Manurewa Whero made short work of the Pukekohe Pythons side winning 50–8, with Alexis Thompson scoring 3 tries and Kaylen Ikitule 2.

Round 2
After a narrow loss the week before Marist gained a close fought 6 try to 5 win over Manurewa Whero by 28 points to 22 at Murray Halberg Park. They led 18–4 before Manurewa scored 18 unanswered points to take a 22–18 lead. Marist tied the scores and then with 3 minutes left Ana Mamea crossed for the winning try, which Chantelle Schofield converted.

Round 3
Pukekohe only had 11 players put still put in a strong effort to only concede 12 tries while scoring 3 of their own, 2 of which were to Savarna Asafo-Tavita, one of which she converted. Peaches Peters scored a hat trick for Manurewa but a late converted try to Delainah Marsters meant the match finished a 22–22 draw.

Round 4
Chantelle Schofield scored 2 tries and kicked 4 conversions in Marists 48–14 win over Pukekohe with Christina Magele Mariner, Nevaeh-Leigh Ormsby, and Ana Mamea also scoring doubles. Glenora Valkyries scored their second consecutive win by beating Manurewa Whero 28–14 at Harold Moody Park in a 6 try performance.

Round 5

Round 6

Round 7

Round 8

Round 9

Round 10

Round 11

Round 12

Women's Championship quarter finals

Women's Championship semi final

Women's Championship grand final
Maunurewa Whero defeated Manukau 34–18 in the championship final after leading 24 to 8 at halftime. Peaches Peters crossed for 4 tries for Manurewa. The match was live streamed and broadcast on Sky TV.

Lower grades

Reserve grade (Premier firsts) competition

Section 1 standings

Section 1 results

Section 2 standings

Section 2 results

Fox Premier Firsts finals
The Richmond - Mangere East preliminary final was streamed by Petes Filming. In the Fox Premiership First quarter finals Te Atatu scored a last minute try, with the long serving Nick Lythgo's conversion sending the match into extra time. Lythgo kicked a penalty goal during extra time and Te Atatu hung on for a tense 36–34 win to maintain their 10–0 unbeaten record. Te Atatu had the right to play their match at Jack Colvin Park in Te Atatu due to being the higher qualifier but allowed the match to be played at Glenora's ground to allow the supporters to see both matches. Otahuhu beat Mangere East 56–16 to advance to meet Te Atatu in the section 2 playoff match. The young Manukau side beat Pt Chevalier 22–18 at Moyle Park and progressed to the section 1 final to play Howick who upset Mt Albert at Fowlds Park 30–20. In the semi finals Te Atatu came from 4–10 down at halftime to lead 22–10 late before Otahuhu scored a consolation try. Pt Chevalier defeated the home side, Manukau, 26–20 to advance to the final. In the grand final Pt Chevalier took a 12–0 lead into halftime and extended it to 18–0 before Te Atatu scored a converted try late in the match with Pt Chevalier hanging on for an 18–6 victory, and in the process handing Te Atatu their only defeat of the season. The match was streamed on Petes Filming.

Fox Championship Premier Firsts finals
The Fox Championship Premier First competition was competed for by sides who had finished in the bottom 3 of section 1 and bottom 2 of section 2. Bay Roskill Vikings defeated Otara Scorpions at Mt Smart Stadium 2 on Friday night, August 5 by 22 points to 14. The match was streamed by Petes Filming.

Ray Cranch Senior B
There were 12 teams competing in the Ray Cranch Senior B competition with Otara entering 2 sides. The Takahiwai rugby league club based in Ruakaka, Northland entered a senior side in the competition and they took out the minor premiership. The Avondale Wolves were affiliated to the Marist Saints club but had a long history stretching back several decades. The Waitemata Seagulls side was principally their senior side which had withdrawn from the Fox Memorial competition at the start of the year. The match between Waitemata and Richmond on May 28 was ruled "null and void" by the judiciary with neither side awarded any points.

Ray Cranch playoffs
The quarter finals were split into top 4 (1v2 & 3v4), and the teams who finished 5th to 8th (5v6 & 7v8). The lower ranked teams won 3 of the 4 matches with the Avondale Wolves being the only home team to win, beating Ponsonby Central Stallions 26–8 at Murray Halberg Park (they are affiliated with the Marist club). The two finalists were Pukekohe Pythons and Takahiwai Northpine Warriors who had finished first and second after the regular season. Pukekohe won the grand final 25–24 at Sunnynook Park on August 20. The curtain-raiser was for the consolation final and was won by Richmond Tokes 36–14 over East Coast Bays.

Junior competitions

Grand finals

Under 18 Boys
Otara Scorpions won the final against Mount Albert Lions by 58 points to 6. The match was live streamed from Mt Smart #2 field. Mangere East defaulted 3 matches and Ellerslie defaulted 1 match.

Under 18 Girls
Otara defeated Howick Eastern United by 32 points to 24. The match was live streamed on sky sport and YouTube.

Under 16 Boys
Marist Saints came back from 20–4 down to beat Mangere East Hawks 22–20 in the final which was played on Mt Smart #2. The match was live streamed on Auckland Rugby League's YouTube channel. Marist and Waitemata both defaulted one match each.

Under 16 Girls
The Mangere East Hawks 'Queenz' won the grand final, defeating Howick Hornets 'Eastern United' by 16 points to 12 at Mountfort Park. Mt Albert Blue defaulted 2 matches as did Richmond Rosebuds, while Glenora, Manurewa and Howick all defaulted one match each.

Under 15 Boys
Papatoetoe Panthers (Pumas) beat Ellerslie Eagles 24–16 in the grand final at Mt Smart #2 after coming back from 16 to 10 down. The match was live streamed on the Auckland Rugby League YouTube channel. Manukau withdrew from the competition after playing 3 games and defaulting one other. Pukekohe defaulted 4 matches, and Bay Roskill one.

Under 14 Boys
The Under 14 grade was split into 2 sections of 8 teams and 7 teams respectively. Otahuhu finished first in section 1 and Mt Albert first in section 2. Mt Albert won the final by 18 points to 16 over Otahuhu on Mt Smart #2. The match was live streamed on the Auckland Rugby League YouTube channel. One of the Manurewa teams (Manurewa Black) was based in Ngāruawāhia.

Section 1

Section 2

Under 14 Girls
The Mangere East Hawks team, nicknamed the 'Elite Bella Hawks' won the grand final, defeating Richmond Rosebuds 28–0 at Mountfort Park in Manurewa. Mangere East finished the season undefeated winning all 12 of their matches. Papakura defaulted 2 matches, while Otara, Marist, Glenora, and Hibiscus Coast all defaulted one match. Manukau had 2 points deducted.

Under 13 Boys
The Under 13 competition was split into 2 sections containing 8 and 10 teams respectively. Mangere East Hawks won section 1, while Ellerslie Eagles won section 2. After the playoffs the two teams met in the final with Ellerslie winning by 22 points to 18 at Mt Smart #2. This was Mangere Easts first defeat of the season. The match was live streamed on the Auckland Rugby League YouTube channel. In section 1 Manurewa defaulted 1 match, while in section 2 Pakuranga defaulted a match.

Section 1

Section 2

Representative fixtures

Senior representative competitions

Sky Sport Men's Premiership
 On September 10 the Men's Premiership began. It featured 4 teams with two of them representing the Tāmaki Makaurau region. Akarana Falcons represented the north, west, and central clubs and were coached by Phil Gordon who was the head coach of the Te Atatu Roosters and had held the position for a few seasons. While Counties Manukau Stingrays represented the east and south clubs and were coached by Brian (Tusa) Lafaele, the Otahuhu Leopards head coach, and Leroy Faavesi as the assistant coach. Marrin Haggie was the head coach of the Waikato Mana.

Table and results

Round 1

Round 2
Macgraff Leuluai made his first appearance for Counties-Manukau in their match with Canterbury. He had returned to New Zealand in 2021 and played for the Otara Scorpions for the past 2 years. Canterbury proved too strong to secure a vital win which put them in position to make the final.

Round 3

Grand final

Akarana Falcons records

Counties Manukau records

Sky Sport Women's Premiership

The Sky Sport Women's Premiership was played over 4 weeks in March and April. It featured 4 teams, including 2 from Auckland. These were the Akarana Falcons W and Counties-Manukau Stingrays W. The other teams from around New Zealand were Mid Central Vipers W (Taranaki, Manawatu, with added players from Wellington), and Canterbury W. The Akarana Falcons W were coached by Steve Buckingham, and Counties-Manukau Stingrays by Greg Selwyn, with James Sarah the assistant coach. The competition was scheduled at the same time as the NRLW competition for players who were unable to relocate to Australia due the covid travel restrictions. All matches were broadcast live on Sky Sports and were also uploaded to the YouTube site (links in references within the game details). The main commentator was Lavina Good with various co-commentators such as former Kiwi Fern Juliana Newman. Akarana Falcons won the competition, defeating Counties-Manukau Stingrays in the final 24–12 at Mount Smart Stadium on April 16. It was their first title in 11 efforts.
The following are the fixtures that the 2 Auckland based teams were involved in.

Table and results

Round 1

Round 2
Greg Selwyn, the Counties-Manukau coach was overseas so James Sarah, the assistant coach took head coaching duties in his absence.

Round 3

Grand final

Tournament Team
Prior to the grand final the following Auckland players were named in the tournament team: Lavinia Tauhalalaiku, Tatiana Finau, Laishon Albert-Jones, Capri Paeku, and Kahu Cassidy from the Akarana Falcons, and Makayla Eli, Cassie Siataga, Teuila Fotu Moala, Annessa Biddle, and Christyl Stowers from the Counties-Manukau Stingrays side. Laishon Albert-Jones was named the tournament MVP.

Akarana Falcons W records

Counties-Manukau W records

National Men's Championship
The National Championship competition was a second-tier competition below the premiership. The winner of it would qualify to gain promotion to the Premiership for 2023. Auckland competed in it despite already having the Akarana Falcons and the Counties Manukau Stingrays already representing the area in the Premiership. The Auckland Vulcans is a side which represents the entire Auckland region but is selected after the Vulcans and Stingrays sides have been chosen and is for all intents and purposes a 'C' team. Nevertheless, due to the strength and depth of the Auckland competition they won the Championship comfortably and were been promoted to join the Falcons and Stingrays in the premiership in 2023. They scored a total of 168 points across 4 games and conceded only 38, winning the final against Otago by 48 points to 12 at North Harbour Stadium in Albany on October 3.

North Island Championship standings

South Island Championship

North Island Championship results

New Zealand Championship final

Junior representative competitions

Ruben Wiki Cup (U20)
 The Ruben Wiki Cup was played for by Akarana Falcons (North Shore and West Auckland), and Counties-Manukau Stingrays (East Auckland and South Auckland) from the Auckland region. The cup is named after former New Zealand rugby league player Ruben Wiki. He also played for the Otahuhu Leopards as a junior and played for the New Zealand Warriors. This was the second year that the competition had been run, though in its inaugural season of 2021 the teams representing the Auckland region were Auckland White and Auckland Blue. Akarana were coached by Henri Nicholas, while Counties Manukau were coached by Gary Kingi and Sean Witanga. The other teams competing were South Island Scorpions, Upper Central Vipers, and Waikato Mana. Akarana advanced to the final where they met the South Island and ran out convincing winners 34–16 at Mount Smart Stadium on April 16.

Ruben Wiki Cup table and fixtures

Fixtures only involving the Auckland representative teams (Akarana Falcons and Counties-Manukau Stingrays).

Round 1

Round 2

Round 3

Round 4

Round 5

Grand final
Akarana won the grand final 34 points to 16 after taking a 22–6 lead into halftime. The MVP of the final was Esom Ioka who scored a try in each half.

Tournament team
Prior to the grand final the 2022 NZRL National U20s tournament team was named and included the following Auckland players; Josh Tanielu, Esom Ioka, Doux Fiatau Kauhiva, Jonpaul White, Elam Payne, Paaua Papuni-Abbott, and Sebastian Su'a from the Akarana side, and Tyson Sang-Yum, and Teariki Ford from the Counties-Manukau side. Doux Fiatau Kauhiva was named the tournament MVP.

Akarana Falcons U20 records

Counties Manukau Stingrays U20 records

Dean Bell Cup (U18)
The 2022 season was the first year that the Dean Bell Cup had been competed for. It “was run by the Auckland Rugby League with support from the Sky Sport Future Warriors Academy and the New Zealand Rugby League”. The trophy is named after Dean Bell who represented the Manukau Magpies club, along with Auckland, and New Zealand from 1983 to 1989 in 26 matches.
The competing teams from Auckland were Tāmaki ki to Raki (North) coached by Bevan Thomas, Tamaki ki te Rawhiti (East) coached by Philip Watson, Tāmaki ki te Tonga (South) coached by Louis Papali’i, and Tāmaki ki te Uru (West) coached by Steven Hatch.

Dean Bell Cup table and fixtures

Grand final
The match was live streamed on Sky Sport Next and on YouTube with Dale Husband, Viggo Rasmussen, and Wade Brunsdon commentating.

Tournament team
Following the grand final an Invitational Junior Warriors U18 touring squad was named to prepare for a three match upper North Island tour during the Term 1 school holidays. The squad was initially 27 players strong but was trimmed down to 23 before the tour. The 27 player squad was AJ Sea (Manurewa Marlins), Allan Talataina (Pt Chevalier), Alvin Chong-Nee (Manurewa), Ben Peni (Otahuhu), Dennis Sofara (Pt Chevalier), Devonte Mihinui (Te Atatū), Denzal Hurt-Pickering (Mt Albert), Elijah Salesa-Leaumoana (Otahuhu), Elijah Rasmussen (Pt Chevalier), Epafasi Fehoko (Manurewa), Francis Tuimauga (Mangere East), Jacob David Auloa (Pt Chevalier), Jarome Falemoe (Manurewa), Jeremiah Cullen (Manurewa), Jeriko Filipi-Talisau (Manurewa), Kayliss Fatialofa (Manurewa), Selumiela Halasima (Pt Chevalier), Ratu Naborisi (Pt Chevalier), Raphael Sio (Pt Chevalier), Regan Brown (New Lynn), Rhys Wikitera-Mataio (Mt Albert), Rodney Vea (Manurewa), Shaye Faa’Aoga (Pt Chevalier), Sio Kali (Pt Chevalier), Siale Mafi Moui Foou Siulangapo (Manurewa), Timothy Tiatia (Manurewa), William Puliu (Mt Albert). Not available for selection: Xavier Harris-Tito (Pt Chevalier).

Shaun Johnson Shield (U16)
The 2022 season was the inaugural year for the Shaun Johnson Shield which is named after New Zealand international and long time New Zealand Warriors player Shaun Johnson. He was a Hibiscus Coast Raiders junior and also played rugby league for Orewa College. The four Auckland teams competing were Tāmaki ki to Raki (North Auckland) coached by Jason Williams, Tamaki ki te Rawhiti (East Auckland) coached by Terry Morrison, Tāmaki ki te Tonga (South Auckland) coached by Ruka Loza, and Tāmaki ki te Uru (West Auckland) coached by Fletcher Butler. The other competing teams were Waitako Mana and the Northern Swords.

Shaun Johnson Shield table and fixtures

Grand Final

Tournament team
At the conclusion of the competition the Auckland Under 16 representative team was named for a three-game tour of the upper North Island from April 21 to May 1. The team selected was Atapana Su'a (Marist), Atelea Filo (Mangere East), Augustino Filipo (Mangere East), Austin Marsters (Marist), Demetrius Kilisimasi (Marist), Dezman Laban (Glenora), Edward Pirika (Mangere East), EJ Mahu-Delamare (Mangere East), Haami Loza (Mangere East), Jarrel Vaega (Marist), Jeremiah Tatupu (Mangere East), Kaawyn Patterson (Westlake Boys), Lucky Kali (Pt Chevalier), Matiasi Lolesio (Otara), Noah Jensen (Richmond), Peter Kengike (Mt Albert), Rico Toeava-Ward (De La Salle), Sione Lisala (Mt Albert), Taipari Wikitera (Marist), Te Paeroa Wineera (Manurewa), Terence Ieriko (Richmond), Vitalano J Roache (Manurewa).

References

External links
 Auckland Rugby League Official Site

Auckland Rugby League seasons
Rugby league in Auckland
Rugby league governing bodies in New Zealand
Rugby league